Toutle is an unincorporated community in Cowlitz County, Washington.

Etymology
Both the town and Toutle River, derive their name from a band of the Skillot people of the Chinookan tribe, the Hullooetell.

Geography
Toutle is near Mount St. Helens and the Mount St. Helens National Volcanic Monument, which lies at the end of the Spirit Lake Memorial Highway.

Education
The Toutle community is part of the Toutle Lake School District, a K-12 school district of about 720 students that serves the communities of Toutle and Silver Lake, Washington.

References

External links
Toutle Lake School District website

Unincorporated communities in Cowlitz County, Washington
Unincorporated communities in Washington (state)